The 1946 Tuskegee Golden Tigers football team was an American football team that represented Tuskegee University as a member of the Southern Intercollegiate Athletic Conference (SIAC) during the 1946 college football season. In their 24th season under head coach Cleveland Abbott, Tuskegee compiled a 10–2 record (5–1 against SIAC opponents), lost to Southern in the Yam Bowl, and outscored all opponents by a total of 287 to 138. 

The Dickinson System rated Tuskegee as the No. 3 black college football team for 1946, behind No. 1 Tennessee A&I and No. 2 Morgan State.

Two Tuskegee players were selected as first-team player on The Pittsburgh Courier's 1946 All-America team: freshman guard Herman Mabrie from Tulsa, Oklahoma; and junior back Whitney Van Cleve from Kokomo, Indiana. Two other were named to the second team: center Simmons and quarterback Robert Moore.

The team played its home games at the Alumni Bowl in Tuskegee, Alabama.

Schedule

References

Tuskegee
Tuskegee Golden Tigers football seasons
Tuskegee Golden Tigers football